Unadilla Forks is a hamlet (and census-designated place) in the Town of Plainfield in Otsego County, New York, United States, at the confluence of the two branches of the Unadilla River on the Otsego-Madison County border.

The Unadilla Forks School was listed on the National Register of Historic Places in 1998.

References

Hamlets in New York (state)
Hamlets in Otsego County, New York